Inside the Rain is a 2019 American romantic comedy-drama film written and directed by and starring Aaron Fisher.  It is Fisher's feature directorial debut.

Cast
Aaron Fisher
Ellen Toland
Eric Roberts
Paul Schulze
Catherine Curtin
Rosie Perez
Rita Raider
Katie Claire McGrath
Kerri Romeo (as Kerri Sohn)

Release
The film premiered at the Woodstock Film Festival in October 2019.

Reception
The film has  rating on Rotten Tomatoes based on 22 reviews with an average rating of 6.5/10.  Tara McNamara of Common Sense Media awarded the film three stars out of five. Joe Leydon of Variety gave the film a positive review and wrote, "Aaron Fisher’s semi-autobiographical dramedy about a manic depressive film student gracefully maneuvers through a fair share of mood swings."

John DeFore of The Hollywood Reporter gave the film a negative review and wrote, "While some who share his struggles may be happy to see Fisher telling his own story here, very little in the self-portrait rings true."

References

External links
 
 

2010s English-language films
American romantic comedy-drama films
2019 romantic comedy-drama films
2019 comedy-drama films
Killer Films films
2010s American films